The 2015 M&M Meat Shops Canadian Junior Curling Championships were held from January 24 to February 1 at the Corner Brook Civic Centre and the Corner Brook Curling Club. The winners represented Canada at the 2015 World Junior Curling Championships in Tallinn, Estonia.

Men

Round Robin Standings
Final Round Robin Standings

Championship Pool Standings
Final Round Robin Standings

Playoffs

Semifinal
Sunday, February 1, 1:30 pm

Final
Sunday, February 1, 8:00 pm

Women

Round Robin Standings
Final Round Robin Standings

Championship Pool Standings
Final Round Robin Standings

Playoffs

Semifinal
Saturday, January 31, 1:30 pm

Final
Saturday, January 31, 8:00 pm

Qualification

The Junior Provincials were held December 28–29 at the Re/Max CC in St. John's (women's) and January 3–6 at the Caribou Curling Club in Stephenville (men's). Junior Women's will be a best 3 of 5 series between the two teams qualified; Junior Men's will be a single round robin. For the playoffs, the Junior Men's division will have the top three teams advancing to the playoffs. If a team goes undefeated in the round robin, they must be beaten twice in the playoffs.

Results:

Men's semi final: Trickett 8 - Taylor 9
Men's final: Smith 7 - Taylor 3

Women (Best 3-of-5): 
Sarah Hill (Re/Max) vs Megan Kearley (Re/Max)
Game 1: Hill 8 - Kearley 2
Game 2: Hill 8 - Kearley 2
Game 3: Hill 7 - Kearley 8
Game 4: Hill 8 - Kearley 3

The Mackie's NS Junior Provincials were held December 27–31 at the Lakeshore Curling Club in Sackville. The event is a modified triple knock-out qualifying three teams in a modified playoff.

Pre-Playoff Results:

Playoff Results:

Men's semi final (N/A): Manuel vs Manuel
Men's final (N/A): Manuel vs Manuel
Women's semi final: McCabe 5 - Fay 6
Women's final (N/A): Fay vs Fay

The Pepsi PEI Provincial Junior Curling Championships were held December 27–31 at the Charlottetown Curling Club in Charlottetown.

The juniors will play a modified triple-knockout format, which will qualify three teams for a championship round.

Pre-Playoff Results:

Playoff Results:
Men's semi final: T. Smith 11 - MacLean 3
Men's final (N/A): T. Smith vs T. Smith
Women's semi final (N/A): V. Smith vs V. Smith
Women's final (N/A): V. Smith vs V. Smith

The O'Leary Junior Provincial Championships are being held January 2–5 at the Beausejour Curling Club and Moncton Curling Association in Moncton. The event is a modified triple knockout, qualifying three teams in a modified playoff.

Results:

Men's semi final: P. Robichaud 5 - Prest 7
Men's final: R. Comeau 5 - Prest 3
Women's semi final: Ward 4 - J. Comeau 5
Women's final: Ward 6 - J. Comeau 10

The Championnat Provincial Junior Brosse Performance are being held from January 4–8 at the Club de curling Etchemin in Lévis, Quebec.

The event is a round-robin with a modified playoff.

Men's semi final: Côté 5 - Richmond 7
Men's final: Asselin 6 - Richmond 3
Women's Tiebreaker 1: Mackay 6 - St-Georges 5
Women's Tiebreaker 2: Jean 3 - Mackay 5
Women's semi final: Gagné 11 - Mackay 2
Women's final: Laurier 3 - Gagné 5

The Pepsi Ontario Junior Curling Championships are being held January 7–11 at the Galt Curling Club in Cambridge, Ontario.

Results:

Men's semi final: Michaud 7 - Kee 3
Men's final: Calwell 9 - Michaud 1
Women's semi final: Brandwood 6 - Horton 3
Women's final: Greenwood 4 - Brandwood 11

The Junior Provincial Championships are being held January 3–6 at the Soo Curlers Association in Sault Ste Marie.

Results:

Men's semi final: Horgan 9 - Acorn 7
Men's final: Warkentin 6 - Horgan 9
Women's semi final: Barclay 6 - Burns 11
Women's final: Smith 3 - Burns 6

The Canola Junior Provincial Championships are being held December 26–31 at the Assiniboine Memorial Curling Club in Winnipeg

Results:

Men's B1 vs R1: Calvert 6 - Dunstone 7
Men's B2 vs R2: Forrester 5 - Peters 7
Men's semi final: Calvert 10 - Peters 5
Men's final: Dunstone 6 - Calvert 7
Women's Tiebreaker 1: Friesen 7 - Oliver 5
Women's Tiebreaker 2: Watling 3 - Reid 7
Women's Tiebreaker 3: Reid 10 - Friesen 4
Women's B1 vs R1: Birchard 9 - Peterson 3
Women's B2 vs R2: Burtnyk 6 - Reid 8
Women's semi final: Peterson 7 - Reid 6
Women's final: Birchard 5 - Peterson 6

The Junior Provincial Championships are being held January 1–5 at the Humboldt Curling Club in Humboldt.

Men's Tiebreaker 1: Cherpin 9 - Dlouhy 7
Men's Tiebreaker 2: Lang 9 - T. Tokarz 6
Men's Tiebreaker 3: ven der Buhs 2 - Lang 8
Men's Tiebreaker 4: Springer 3 - Cherpin 9
Men's A1 vs. B1: Hersikorn 6 - Kleiter 5
Men's A2 vs. B2: Lang 9 - Cherpin 2
Men's semi final: Kleiter 10 - Lang 4
Men's final: Hersikorn 10 - Kleiter 3
Women's Tiebreaker: Mitchell 5 - B. Tokarz 4
Women's A1 vs. B1: Streifel 8 - Jones 6
Women's A2 vs. B2: Kitz 6 - Mitchell 9
Women's semi final: Jones 2 - Mitchell 8
Women's final: Streifel 9 - Mitchell 5

The Subway Junior Provincials are being held January 7–11 at the Grande Prairie Curling Club in Grande Prairie.

Results:

Men's semi final: Harty 8 - Scoffin 7
Men's final: Sturmay 7 - Harty 4
Women's semi final: DeJong 7 - Sturmay 4
Women's final: Rocque 6 - DeJong 5

The Tim Horton's Junior Provincial Championships were held December 28–January 3 at the Parksville Curling Club in Parksville.

Results:

Men's semi final: Henderson 11 - Love 7
Men's final: Tanaka 8 - Henderson 9
Women's semi final: Brown 7 - Coulombe 2
Women's final: Daniels 2 - Brown 8

Hosted Dec. 20-21 at the Whitehorse CC in Whitehorse 
Men's Winners: Joe Wallingham
Women's Winners: Bailey Horte defeated Alyssa Meger

Hosted Dec. 28-30 at the Fort Smith CC in Fort Smith.

Results:

Men's winner: Matthew Miller (Inuvik)

Women: Sadie Pinksen (Iqaluit CC)
Men: Kane Komaksiutiksak (Qavik CC)

References

External links

Junior Championships
Canadian Junior Curling Championships, 2015
Corner Brook
Canadian Junior Curling Championships